The Ambassador of Malaysia to the Netherlands is the head of Malaysia's diplomatic mission to the Netherlands. The position has the rank and status of an Ambassador Extraordinary and Plenipotentiary and is based in the Embassy of Malaysia, The Hague.

List of heads of mission

Ambassadors to the Netherlands

See also
 Malaysia–Netherlands relations

References 

 
Netherlands
Malaysia